Raquel Barros Aldunate (2 December 1919 – 11 August 2014) was a Chilean folklorist, noted for her studies and dissemination of .

Biography
In 1952 Raquel Barros founded the Folkloric Association of Chile, of which she was the director for many years. This group, currently called the Raquel Barros Folkloric Group of Chile, is the oldest such group in the country. Between 1958 and 1980 she was a researcher at the University of Chile at the Institute of Musical Research and then at the Music Department. Barros was vice-dean and assistant dean of the Faculty of Musical Sciences and Arts and Performance of that house of studies between 1974 and 1975.

Barros always combined research with the practice of folklore. Even at an advanced age she was working on the dissemination of Chilean culture. At 82 she headed the cultural center of the Municipality of Recoleta.

In 1996, she was appointed Corresponding Member of the Permanent International Folklore Commission, based in Buenos Aires, Argentina. In 2004 she was a member of the "FONDART" Project Qualification Commission of the National Council of Culture and the Arts. 

Publications
Some of Barros' publications include:

 "El folklore de Chiloé", published by the National Secretariat of Women for the OAS meeting, Santiago, 1976 (with Manuel Dannemann)
 "La poesía folklórica de Melipilla", Revista Musical Chilena, No. 60, Santiago, 1958
 "La danza folklórica chilena – Investigación y enseñanza", Revista Musical Chilena, No. 71, Santiago, 1960
 "El guitarrón en el Depto. de Puente Alto", Revista Musical Chilena, No. 74, Santiago, 1960
 "Introducción al estudio de la tonada", Revista Musical Chilena, No. 109, Santiago, 1964
 Guía metodológica para el estudio del folklore chileno, Editorial Universitaria, Santiago, 1964
 La ruta de la Virgen de Palo Colorado, Santiago, 1966
 El romancero chileno, Santiago, 1970

Honors
Raquel Barros received countless awards and recognitions for her work disseminating Chilean folklore, both in Chile and in other countries. In 1992 she won a medal from the Municipality of Santiago for her contribution to traditional Chilean culture; this municipality had already given her a medal in 1971 when the 20 years of the Chilean Folkloric Association were approaching. In 2013 she received the Altazor Award in the Traditional Folklore – Researcher category. In 2014 she received the Pablo Neruda Order of Artistic and Cultural Merit along with 11 other personalities from her country's artistic field.

References

1919 births
2014 deaths
Chilean folklorists
Chilean people of Basque descent
People from Santiago
Academic staff of the University of Chile